The Kissing Booth film series consists of American teen-romantic comedy films developed and released as Netflix original films, exclusively for the streaming service. Based on the novels written by Beth Reekles, the plot centers around Rochelle (Shelly) "Elle" Evans, and the complications that arise when she begins dating her best friend's older brother. The series explores the teenage experiences of high school, popularity, dating, and friendship.

Although it was poorly-received by critics, the series as a whole has seen success in its streaming numbers with audiences. Netflix officially identified it as one of its consistently most-viewed releases.

Film

The Kissing Booth (2018) 

Rochelle "Elle" Evans, is a popular and outgoing student at her high school. Despite this, she has never been kissed. Together with her life-long best friend Lee, the pair plan a kissing booth event as a fundraiser for their school at a Spring Carnival fair. Elle has always had a secret crush on Lee's bad-boy older brother, named Noah. For years, she never acted on her feelings, since she and Lee had written rules about their friendship. One of those rules was to never date each other's family members. After sharing a kiss at the event, Elle and Noah begin a secret romantic relationship. When Lee finds out, there is a strain on the pair's friendship. After some time, their differences are overcome. Elle navigates the complexities of teenage-drama, while Noah prepares for Ivy League college experience at Harvard University. As he leaves, Elle realizes that though she doesn't know what the future holds, her romance with Noah will always be a part of her.

The Kissing Booth 2 (2020) 

Elle begins her senior year of high school, while Noah is a freshman at Harvard. The couple navigate their lives, balancing full schedules of education and studies, and continuing their long-distance relationship. This is complicated as each of them find attraction elsewhere; Elle with a new student named Marco, and Noah with a British student named Chloe. Elle tags along with her best friend and his girlfriend named Rachel, as a third wheel on the couple's dates, only to unintentionally cause friction in their relationship. Noah meanwhile asks Elle to once again break one of her best friend rules with Lee, and wants her to move to attend college with him once she graduates high school. Lee however wants her to continue her schooling, with him at  Berkeley. Noah realizes that his feelings for Chloe are only as a friend, while Marco tries to convince Elle that they have something more. Noah and Elle reconcile at her graduation. Elle receives letters from Harvard and Berkeley notifying her that she is accepted at both schools. She faces the difficult decision of choosing her best friend, or her love life with Noah.

The Kissing Booth 3 (2021) 

In July 2020, it was announced that a third entry in the series had been filmed back-to-back with the previous film. As principal photography had been completed before the coronavirus pandemic outbreak, its release will be affected, as was much of the film industry.

Cast and characters

Additional crew and production details

Reception

References 

American film series
English-language Netflix original films
Teen film series